The 1996–97 Honduran Segunda División was the 30th season of the Honduran Segunda División.  Under the management of Mario Sandoval, Atlético Indio won the tournament after defeating Halcón Terrazos in the final series and obtained promotion to the 1997–98 Honduran Liga Nacional.

Final

 Atlético Indio won 3–1 on aggregate.
 It is unclear how Palestino was promoted to 1997–98 Honduran Liga Nacional instead of Atlético Indio.

References

Segunda
1996